Harminius is a genus of beetles belonging to the family Elateridae.

The species of this genus are found in Europe and Japan.

Species:
 Harminius gigas (Reitter, 1890)
 Harminius nihonicus
 Harminius singularis
 Harminius triundulatus (Mannerheim, 1853)

References

Elateridae
Elateridae genera